San Fernando (Spanish for "St. Ferdinand") is a general-law city in the San Fernando Valley region of Los Angeles County, California, in the Los Angeles metropolitan area. It is bordered on all sides by the City of Los Angeles. As of the 2010 census the population of San Fernando was 23,645.

History

Prior to the arrival of Spanish missionaries and soldiers, the area of San Fernando was in the northwestern extent of Tovaangar, or the homelands of the Tongva. The nearby village of Pasheeknga was a major site for the Tongva, being the most populous village in the San Fernando Valley at the time. The homelands of the Tataviam could be found to the north and the Chumash to the west.

Spanish colonial period 
The Mission San Fernando Rey de España (named after St. Ferdinand) was founded in 1797 at the site of Achooykomenga, an agricultural rancho established by Juan Francisco Reyes for Pueblo de Los Ángeles worked by Ventureño Chumash, Fernandeño (Tongva), and Tataviam laborers.

In 1833, the mission was secularized by the Mexican government. During its time as a mission, 1,367 native children were baptized at San Fernando, of which 965 died in childhood. The high death rate of children and adults at the missions sometimes led those kept at the mission to run away.

Rancho land grant 
In 1846, the area became part of the Mexican land grant of Rancho Ex-Mission San Fernando. In 1874, Charles Maclay, bought  of the Rancho. 

In 1882, cousins George K. Porter and Benjamin F. Porter, of future Porter Ranch, each received one-third of the total land. In 1885, Maclay founded the Maclay School of Theology, a Methodist seminary in San Fernando. After his death it became an affiliate and moved to the campus of the University of Southern California and then the Claremont School of Theology.

While most of the towns in the surrounding San Fernando Valley agreed to annexation by Los Angeles in the 1910s, eager to tap the bountiful water supply provided by the newly opened Los Angeles Aqueduct, San Fernando's abundant groundwater supplies allowed it to remain a separate city.

Incorporation 
In the first half of the 20th century after incorporation in 1911, the city of San Fernando tried to extend its city limits to Sylmar, Mission Hills and Pacoima, but the city of Los Angeles kept up their rapid annexation and caused many failed attempts. 

By the 1950s, the city said that annexation was hard to do, due to the large bureaucracy of Los Angeles. As the San Fernando Valley transitioned from an agricultural area to a suburban one in the decades after World War II, San Fernando retained its independence.

As with much of the San Fernando Valley east of the San Diego Freeway, the city of San Fernando has seen a significant demographic shift in recent years. Declining birth-rates and an aging population of middle-class whites, who once dominated the area in the 1950s, has contributed to the movement into other parts of the San Fernando Valley. There has also been movement into the Santa Clarita and Antelope Valleys to the north.

Geography and climate

San Fernando is completely surrounded by the city of Los Angeles, with the neighborhoods of Sylmar to the north, Lake View Terrace to the east, Pacoima to the south, and Mission Hills to the west.  It is served by the Golden State (Interstate 5), Foothill (Interstate 210), Ronald Reagan (State Route 118), and San Diego (Interstate 405) freeways.

Demographics

2010
At the 2010 census San Fernando had a population of 23,645. The racial makeup of San Fernando was 12,068 (51.0%) White (5.3% Non-Hispanic White), 222 (0.9%) African American, 314 (1.3%) Native American, 248 (1.0%) Asian, 33 (0.1%) Pacific Islander, 9,877 (41.8%) from other races, and 883 (3.7%) from two or more races. There were 21,687 Hispanic or Latino residents, of any race (92.5%).

The census reported that 23,531 people (99.5% of the population) lived in households, 46 (0.2%) lived in non-institutionalized group quarters, and 68 (0.3%) were institutionalized.

There were 5,967 households, 3,247 (54.4%) had children under the age of 18 living in them, 3,282 (55.0%) were opposite-sex married couples living together, 1,098 (18.4%) had a female householder with no husband present, 592 (9.9%) had a male householder with no wife present.  There were 476 (8.0%) unmarried opposite-sex partnerships, and 34 (0.6%) same-sex married couples or partnerships. 731 households (12.3%) were one person and 295 (4.9%) had someone living alone who was 65 or older. The average household size was 3.94.  There were 4,972 families (83.3% of households); the average family size was 4.18.

The age distribution was 6,941 people (29.4%) under the age of 18, 2,659 people (11.2%) aged 18 to 24, 7,132 people (30.2%) aged 25 to 44, 4,920 people (20.8%) aged 45 to 64, and 1,993 people (8.4%) who were 65 or older.  The median age was 30.7 years. For every 100 females, there were 100.7 males.  For every 100 females age 18 and over, there were 98.2 males.

There were 6,291 housing units at an average density of 2,649.9 per square mile, of the occupied units 3,252 (54.5%) were owner-occupied and 2,715 (45.5%) were rented. The homeowner vacancy rate was 1.1%; the rental vacancy rate was 3.9%.  13,425 people (56.8% of the population) lived in owner-occupied housing units and 10,106 people (42.7%) lived in rental housing units.

According to the 2010 United States Census, San Fernando had a median household income of $55,192, with 16.9% of the population living below the federal poverty line.

2000
At the 2000 census there were 23,564 people in 5,774 households, including 4,832 families, in the city. The population density was 9,880.7 inhabitants per square mile (3,822.7/km). The racial makeup of the city was 42.76% White, 0.98% African American, 1.69% Native American, 1.12% Asian, 0.11% Pacific Islander, 49.35% from other races, and 3.98% from two or more races. Hispanic or Latino of any race were 89.28%.

Of the 5,774 households 52.8% had children under the age of 18 living with them, 59.1% were married couples living together, 16.4% had a female householder with no husband present, and 16.3% were non-families. 12.4% of households were one person and 5.6% were one person aged 65 or older.  The average household size was 4.07 and the average family size was 4.33.

The age distribution was 34.4% under the age of 18, 11.4% from 18 to 24, 32.1% from 25 to 44, 15.0% from 45 to 64, and 7.0% 65 or older.  The median age was 27 years. For every 100 females, there were 101.7 males.  For every 100 females age 18 and over, there were 99.9 males.

The median household income was $39,909 and the median family income  was $40,138. Males had a median income of $26,068 versus $22,599 for females. The per capita income for the city was $11,485. 15.3% of families and 19.1% of the population were below the poverty line, including 22.5% of those under age 18 and 15.6% of those age 65 or over.

Economy

Top employers

According to the city's 2017-2018 annual financial report, the top ten employers in the city (not including the city itself as an employer) are:

As of 2018, the City of San Fernando has a total labor force of 11,700 with 4,035 (34.49%) working for the top ten employers listed. The City of San Fernando also employs 129 people as of 2018.

Arts and culture 
The city hosts public celebrations such as 4th of July festivities and summer movie nights in city parks. Mexican-American culture is prevalent and the city hosts Día de los Muertos festivals and community classes teaching "Aztec" and Folklórico dances.

Parks and recreation 
The San Fernando Recreation and Community Services (RCS) Department maintains multiple parks and recreation centers in the city and provides residents with recreational amenities, programs and services. Various social clubs cater to senior residents providing them with crafting and gardening programs and social events.

Government

Municipal government
The City of San Fernando is governed by a city council. Members of the City Council are elected at-large and serve four year terms. The mayor is appointed every year, on a rotating basis, by a majority vote of the council. The Council meets on the first and third Monday of each month at 6:00 pm in the Council Chambers.

State and federal representation

In the United States Senate, San Fernando is represented by California's senators Dianne Feinstein and Alex Padilla.

Education

San Fernando is served by the Los Angeles Unified School District.

San Fernando is served by the following LAUSD schools:
 O'Melveny Elementary School
 Morningside Elementary School
 San Fernando Elementary School
 Gridley Elementary School in nearby Sylmar
 San Fernando Middle School
 San Fernando institute for Applied Media
 César Chávez Learning Academies 
 San Fernando High School
 Vaughn International Studies Academy (VISA); Charter School

The nearest community college to San Fernando is Los Angeles Mission College in the Sylmar neighborhood of Los Angeles.

PUC Schools operates some charter schools in San Fernando. They include Nueva Esperanza Charter Academy (MS and HS) and PUC Inspire Charter Academy. At one time Lakeview Charter Academy and Triumph Charter Academy, both of PUC Schools, were located in San Fernando now they are located in Sylmar.

A private school, The Concordia Schools San Fernando, was in the city. First Lutheran Schools was previously located where Concordia San Fernando was later now located. In 2011 the middle and high school consolidated into Concordia Junior Senior High School.

Public library 
The County of Los Angeles Public Library operates the San Fernando Library at 217 North Maclay Avenue.

Infrastructure
The Los Angeles County Department of Health Services operates the Pacoima Health Center in Pacoima in Los Angeles, serving the City of San Fernando.

The City of San Fernando produces, treats, sells and maintains its own water supply.

The United States Postal Service operates the San Fernando Post Office.

Police
Police services in San Fernando is provided by the San Fernando Police Department.  The police department has 35 sworn police officers and 25 non-sworn personnel. The department is also augmented by 20 sworn reserve police officers. In times of need, the police department can deploy a total of 55 sworn police officers.

The San Fernando Police Department is a member of the Los Angeles County Disaster Management Area "C".  Area "C" consists of the cities of Burbank, Pasadena, Glendale, San Fernando, San Gabriel, Monterey Park, Alhambra and South Pasadena. The San Fernando Police have, in the past, requested mutual aid from the LAPD during major incidents.

Fire
The Los Angeles Fire Department provides fire protection services for the city of San Fernando, which serves
the community from three nearby fire stations (Station 75, Station 91, and Station 98), all of which are located in the City of Los Angeles.

Fire Station 75 in Mission Hills serves western San Fernando. Fire Station 91 in Sylmar serves northeast San Fernando Fire Station 98 in Pacoima serves southeast San Fernando.

Transportation

The Sylmar/San Fernando Metrolink station serves the city on the Antelope Valley Line that passes through the city on a route adjacent to and parallel with San Fernando Boulevard. The officials and citizens have expressed their concern about the impact of the California High-Speed Rail if it follows the same route through the city. The city will become the future northern terminus of the East San Fernando Valley Transit Corridor, the valley's first light rail line by 2027.

See also

Notable people
 Paula Abdul, television personality
 Don Prudhomme, NHRA drag racing driver
 George Lopez, comedian, television actor, philanthropist
 Marlyn Mason, actress
 David Wark Griffith pioneer of silent motion pictures at his Griffith Ranch
 Joey Olivo, world light-flyweight champion boxer

References

External links

 
1911 establishments in California
Cities in Los Angeles County, California
Communities in the San Fernando Valley
Incorporated cities and towns in California
Populated places established in 1911
Enclaves in the United States